Fatimo Isaak Bihi is a Somali former diplomat. She was the first ever female ambassador (Ambassador to Switzerland). Bihi is also the former Director of the African Department of the Ministry of Foreign Affairs, as well as being a former Permanent Representative for Somalia at the United Nations.

References 

Year of birth missing (living people)
Living people
Ambassadors of Somalia to Switzerland
Permanent Representatives of Somalia to the United Nations
Somalian women diplomats
Ethnic Somali people
Women ambassadors